Temujin is the birthname of Genghis Khan, the founder of the Mongol Empire.

Temujin may also refer to:

 Temüjin (video game), a 1997 computer game
 Pürevjavyn Temüüjin or Temujin (born 1994), Mongolian taekwondo Olympian and Asian Games gold medal winner
 Temujin, a character in the Japanese film Naruto the Movie: Legend of the Stone of Gelel
 Temujin, a horse ridden by Chinese equestrian Alex Hua Tian (born 1989) in several competitions

See also
 
 
 Genghis (disambiguation)
 Genghis Khan (disambiguation)
 Chinggis (disambiguation)
 Temugin, a Marvel Comics character, the son of the Mandarin, an Iron Man villain
 Temujinia or Temujiniidae, a genera of the Gobiguania clade of extinct iguanian lizards
 Genghis Temüjin Khan, a character in The Hitchhiker's Guide to the Galaxy